Eric John Shepherd (19 June 1894 – 30 August 1967) was an Australian politician. He was the Labor member for Victoria in the South Australian House of Assembly from 1924 to 1933. From 1930 to 1933 he was Speaker of the House.

Shepherd had served in World War I in France and had won the Military Medal.

References

 

1894 births
1967 deaths
Members of the South Australian House of Assembly
Speakers of the South Australian House of Assembly
Place of birth missing
Australian Labor Party members of the Parliament of South Australia
20th-century Australian politicians